In Greek mythology, Busiris (Ancient Greek: Βούσιρις) was an Egyptian king who was killed by Heracles.

Biography
Isocrates, in his witty declamation Busiris, recounts "the false tale of Heracles and Busiris" (11.30–11.40), which was a comic subject represented almost entirely in the repertory of early 5th century BC Athenian vase-painters: the theme has a narrow narrative range, according to Niall Livingstone: Heracles being led to sacrifice; his escape; the killing of Busiris; the rout of his entourage.

In Isocrates' rhetorical use of a theme that he considers unworthy of serious treatment, the villainous king of Egypt named Busiris, a son of Poseidon and Libya or Lysianassa, was the ancient founder of Egyptian civilization, with an imagined "model constitution" that Isocrates sets up as a parodic contrast to the Republic by Plato. Otherwise, Busiris's mother was Anippe, daughter of the river-god Nilus. The monstrous Busiris sacrificed all visitors to his gods. Heracles defied Busiris, broke out of his shackles at the last minute, and killed him.

In Diodorus Siculus, Busiris appears as the founder of the line of kings at Thebes, which historically would have been the 11th Dynasty.

According to Hyginus, Busiris was the father of Melite, who became the mother of Metus by her grandfather Poseidon.

This part of the mythology concerning Herakles appears to have origins in a corruption of an Egyptian myth concerning Osiris' sacrifice by Set, and subsequent resurrection (see Legend of Osiris and Isis).

In popular culture
The fictional king Busiris appears as the leader of a revolt in Lucian's True History (2.23), written in the 2nd century CE.

In Paradise Lost, John Milton uses "Busiris" as the name of the Pharaoh of the Exodus, which suggests a comparison between Heracles' escape and the Israelites' escape from slavery.

In Don Quixote (Part II, Chapter LX) the bandit Roque Guinart refers to himself as "not some cruel Osiris," meaning "Busiris."

Notes

References
 Apollodorus, The Library with an English Translation by Sir James George Frazer, F.B.A., F.R.S. in 2 Volumes, Cambridge, MA, Harvard University Press; London, William Heinemann Ltd. 1921. ISBN 0-674-99135-4. Online version at the Perseus Digital Library. Greek text available from the same website.
 Diodorus Siculus, The Library of History translated by Charles Henry Oldfather. Twelve volumes. Loeb Classical Library. Cambridge, Massachusetts: Harvard University Press; London: William Heinemann, Ltd. 1989. Vol. 3. Books 4.59–8. Online version at Bill Thayer's Web Site
 Diodorus Siculus, Bibliotheca Historica. Vol 1-2. Immanel Bekker. Ludwig Dindorf. Friedrich Vogel. in aedibus B. G. Teubneri. Leipzig. 1888–1890. Greek text available at the Perseus Digital Library.
 Gaius Julius Hyginus, Fabulae from The Myths of Hyginus translated and edited by Mary Grant. University of Kansas Publications in Humanistic Studies. Online version at the Topos Text Project.
 Lucius Mestrius Plutarchus, Moralia with an English Translation by Frank Cole Babbitt. Cambridge, MA. Harvard University Press. London. William Heinemann Ltd. 1936. Online version at the Perseus Digital Library. Greek text available from the same website.

Further reading 

 Livingstone, Niall "A Commentary on Isocrates' Busiris" (Brill) 2001. The first scholarly commentary devoted to Busiris.

External links 

 

Children of Poseidon
Demigods in classical mythology
Kings of Egypt in Greek mythology
Kings in Greek mythology
Mythology of Heracles
Egyptian characters in Greek mythology